Illan Stéphane Meslier (born 2 March 2000) is a French professional footballer who plays as a goalkeeper for Premier League club Leeds United.

Early life
Illan Stéphane Meslier was born on 2 March 2000 in Lorient, Brittany.

Club career

Lorient

Meslier began playing football with his local club Merlevenez at the age of 6, and after a successful match against FC Lorient joined their academy. On 1 February 2018, he signed his first professional contract with Lorient. In July 2018, Lorient rejected a €10 million bid from Ligue 1 side AS Monaco for Meslier. He also received interest from English Premier League side Chelsea. 

He stayed at Lorient, and shortly made his professional debut under then manager Mickaël Landreau for Lorient in a 1–0 Coupe de la Ligue win over Valenciennes FC on 14 August 2018. He kept a clean sheet consecutively in his first five games as a professional, conceding his first ever goal in his 6th game against Paris FC. He saved an injury time penalty from Clermont player Manuel Perez in Lorient's 1–0 win against Clermont. He solidified his place as the club's number 1 keeper during the 2018–19 season, playing 30 times in all competitions, keeping 11 clean sheets. With his form helping Lorient finish in 6th in 2018–19 Ligue 2 but narrowly missing out on the playoffs due to goal difference compared with RC Lens.

Leeds United

2019–20 season
On 8 August 2019, Meslier was signed on a season-long loan by English Championship team Leeds United, with Leeds also having the option to buy Meslier on a permanent deal. He started the season as second choice goalkeeper behind Kiko Casilla and competing with Kamil Miazek for a place on the bench, Meslier gained a reputation as a penalty saving expert after saving three separate penalties for Leeds United under-23's by December.

On 4 January 2020, head coach Marcelo Bielsa announced that Meslier would make his debut on 6 January in Leeds' FA Cup tie against Premier League side Arsenal. With Meslier putting in an impressive performance against the Premier League side in a 1–0 defeat on his debut, he was praised for his distribution and his saves during the match. On 29 February 2020, he made his league debut for Leeds in a 4–0 victory away at Hull City.

Meslier finished the season as first choice at Leeds after an eight-game suspension to fellow goalkeeper Kiko Casilla, with Meslier keeping seven clean sheets in his 10 league games to help Leeds become Champions and win promotion to the Premier League.

2020–21 season
On 23 July 2020, Meslier joined Leeds permanently following their promotion to the Premier League, for a reported £5m transfer fee, signing a three-year contract. Meslier made his 2020–21 Premier League debut in the first match of the season against Liverpool on 12 September 2020, starting in the 3–4 defeat at Anfield to the reigning champions. On 28 September, Meslier was named man of the match in the Yorkshire derby 1–0 win over Sheffield United at Bramall Lane, after making a string of fine saves including a point blank reflex save at 0–0.

On 23 February 2021, Meslier became the first goalkeeper under the age of 21 to record 11 clean sheets in a single Premier League season, eventually finishing the season with 11.

2021–22 season
On 13 August 2021, Meslier signed a new deal which extended his contract until 2026.

2022–23 season 
Meslier's performance against Liverpool on 29 October 2022, in which he made nine saves to give his side a 2–1 away win and take them out of the relegation zone, saw him awarded the Premier League Man of the Match award. He made his 100th appearance for Leeds at Elland Road on 4 January 2023, in a 2–2 draw with West Ham.

International career
Meslier has been capped at international level by France, all the way up to France U21s. He was also part of the France U20 squad for the 2019 FIFA U-20 World Cup playing as the first choice goalkeeper in May 2019.

In November 2019, Meslier was called up the France U21 squad and was named as an unused substitute in a 3–1 defeat against Switzerland U21's on 19 November 2019. He was called up again to the France U21 squad in August 2020 for fixtures against Georgia U21 and Azerbaijan U21. He made his debut for the under-21 team playing in the quarter final against the Netherlands on 31 May 2021.

Style of play
Due to his appearance and physical stature, Meslier's goalkeeping style has been compared to that of Belgian goalkeeper Thibaut Courtois.

Career statistics

Honours
Leeds United
EFL Championship: 2019–20

Individual
Leeds United Young Player of the Year: 2020–21

References

External links

 Profile at the Leeds United F.C. website
 
 

2000 births
Living people
Sportspeople from Lorient
Footballers from Brittany
French footballers
Association football goalkeepers
FC Lorient players
Leeds United F.C. players
Championnat National 2 players
Ligue 2 players
English Football League players
Premier League players
France youth international footballers
France under-21 international footballers
French expatriate footballers
Expatriate footballers in England
French expatriate sportspeople in England